Brisbane Boys' College (BBC) is an independent, Presbyterian and Uniting Church, day and boarding school for boys, located in Toowong, a suburb of Brisbane, Queensland, Australia.

Established in 1902, the college has a non-selective enrolment policy and caters for approximately 1,700 students from Prep to 12, including 140 boarders from Years 5 to 12.

Brisbane Boys' College is a school of the Presbyterian and Methodist Schools Association (PMSA), and is affiliated with the Australian Boarding Schools Association (ABSA), the Junior School Heads Association of Australia (JSHAA)serge,  and the Association of Heads of Independent Schools of Australia (AHISA). The school is also a founding member of the Great Public Schools' Association Inc (GPS).

Some of the Brisbane Boys' College Buildings are listed on the Queensland Heritage Register.

History 

Brisbane Boys' College was established in 1902 by Arthur Rudd. Rudd arrived in Brisbane in 1901 by boat from Melbourne and started a school in Clayfield. The school officially started in March 1902 with just four students.

In 1912, the school moved to a new location on the corner of Bayview Terrace, near the tram terminus, needing more room. Even with the new land, due to space constraints sporting activities were out of the question, so for many years the boys walked to the nearby Kalinga Park. In 1908, there were 80 students and a cadet corps was formed with the impending 1914–1918 war. The school suffered the losses of eight Clayfield Collegians during the war. In 1931, the school was moved, again due to a lack of room for new facilities, to its current site in Toowong with support from its owners, the daughters of the late Premier of Queensland, Sir Robert Philp. The Clayfield campus became a primary school department of Somerville House, which later developed into the independent Clayfield College.

Today BBC is owned by the Presbyterian and Methodist Schools Association, which was formed in 1918, and owns other private schools in Queensland.

Headmasters

Campus 

BBC's campus is located in the Brisbane suburb of Toowong on land bordered by Moggill Road, Kensington Terrace and Miskin Street, with the main entrance from Kensington Terrace.

The main building dates from the early 1930s, when the school moved to the site, and is characterised by its arches and clock tower in the Mission Revival architecture style. The Rudd and Hamilton wings, built in 1963, form a T-shape extending away from the main building, and the modern glass fronted Resource Centre, built in 1996, fills the quadrant. Other buildings on the site include McKenzie wing (built in 1983), Barbara Helen Thomson Sports Complex (opened in 1987), and the Birtles wing (built in 1973). The main Junior School precinct was completed in early 2008, and a separate building catering exclusively to Prep students was completed in mid 2007. The Junior School precinct was designed in light of the introduction of Years Prep to Grade 3 in 2007. The old college hall (built in 1979) was demolished in late September 2009 and a new college hall was constructed and opened in early June 2011. The present college hall includes an air conditioned auditorium capable of seating 695 people, the Phil Bisset Gallery, and facilities for the music department.
In 2014, a new state of the art Middle School precinct was completed, which is situated next to the Junior School buildings.

There are three ovals included within the BBC grounds: the John Noblet Oval, the Parents & Friends Association Oval, and Miskin Oval. BBC also makes use of the Oakman Park ovals, Toowong College (QASMT), University of Queensland and St Lucia, Queensland playing fields. The school plans to build new sporting facilities in a location detached from the main school, possibly in Corinda, though this has sparked local residents' concerns about traffic problems and noise pollution.

Uniform 
The college uniform varies throughout the grades, these being between Years Prep–3, 4–6, 7–11 and 12. One defining factor of the uniform is the boater, a straw hat worn to and from the school and in public that has been a college tradition since its conception. In Years 4–6, the uniform consists of a green shirt, a green and black tie, grey shorts and plain grey socks.
In Years 7–11, the only difference is that trousers are worn, and in Year 12 a white shirt is worn.

Green, white and black striped blazers are worn in terms 2 and 3. Blazers display "Colours" which are awards that warrant embroidery on the pockets of the blazer. Lines, Half-Colours and Full-Colours are displayed on the bottom, top right-hand and top left-hand and pocket respectively, and each display a line of text detailing the category of achievement and the year the award was given. Half-Colours and Full-Colours exhibit altered forms of the BBC emblem, while school captains have a gold full colour emblem.

Students in leadership positions, such as house captains and prefects, are given a badge with their name and position within the school. Prefects wear a tie and boater-band, of which both feature green, black and gold stripes.

House system 
The school is divided into a house system with ten houses.

Co-curriculum

Music
The music department hosts string, orchestral and vocal ensembles, as well as concert and stage bands throughout the levels of the school. Brisbane Boys' College maintains the tradition of conducting a pipe band, which plays at public events such as the annual ANZAC Day March in Brisbane and the 2018 Royal Edinburgh Military Tattoo in Edinburgh and in the special 2019 Sydney Tattoo.

Sport
The college offers rugby, football, rowing, gymnastics, cricket, basketball, volleyball, chess, tennis, cross-country, Australian rules football, athletics, swimming, waterpolo, golf and sailing.

They have a number of former representative players and coaches as directors and coaches at the college.
Rugby union director: Steve Philpotts – former Australian schoolboys rugby head coach
Cricket director: David Marriott – former Australian schoolboys cricket and rugby representative
Rugby union first XV head coach: Shane Drahm – former English international and Queensland Reds player
Cricket head coach: Hamish Gardiner – current batsman for the Scottish national cricket team

Recent sporting achievements 
Brisbane Boys' College has achieved sporting success as a GPS school in the following activities:
Track and Field – 2016, 2017, 2018
Australian Football – 2001, 2003, 2004, 2005, 2009
Basketball – 1987, 1995, 2005, 2011, 2017
Cricket – 2003, 2020 
Cross Country - 2018, 2019
Football – 1991, 1993, 2004, 2010, 2011
Gymnastics – 1998, 1999, 2000, 2001, 2004, 2007
Rowing – 2002, 2003, 2021, 2022
Volleyball – 1994, 1995, 1996, 2001, 2019
Tennis – 2006, 2007, 2008, 2011, 2013, 2014, 2015, 2016, 2017, 2018, 2019, 2020
Sailing – 2007, 2008, 2011

Rowing club

The BBC Rowing Club is active throughout the year however the primary season is during terms 1 and 4, and is open to boys in Years 7–12. The boathouse is located on the Brisbane River, near the University of Queensland at St Lucia. The club has been successful since its first race in 1918, winning more Queensland Head of the River races than any other school. The club's most recent wins were in 2002, 2003, 2021 and 2022.

The club was founded in 1916, by school founder A W Rudd. The first shed was built on Breakfast Creek in 1918, with the club winning its first Head of the River the following year. The shed was moved to the banks of the Brisbane River near the Regatta Hotel in 1930, where it was destroyed by flood in 1974. A new shed was built near the University of Queensland at St Lucia in 1976.

The club is split into four stages – Junior (grades 7, 8 and 9), Under 15 (grades 9 and 10), Under 16 (grades 10 and 11) and Open (grades 11 and 12). Juniors and Under 15s row in quad sculls, and Under 16s and Opens row eights. The 1st VIII has been successful at the Head of the River on 23 occasions, winning in 1919, 1934, 1937, 1938, 1946, 1947, 1949, 1950, 1951, 1952, 1956, 1957, 1961, 1962, 1965, 1966, 1968, 1972, 1974, 1990, 1992, 1993, 2002, 2021 and 2022. The club's 1st VIII also won the Princess Elizabeth Challenge Cup at the Henley Royal Regatta in 1993, becoming the first Australian crew to do so.

In recent times Brisbane Boys' College rowers have gone on to represent Queensland and Australia in Regattas worldwide. John Dickson (Alumni 2005), Scott Laidler (Alumni 2007), Harrison Westbrook (Alumni 2008) and Cameron Stitt (Alumni 2008) are just some of the examples of old boys who have performed at representative level.

Notable alumni

See also

Lists of schools in Queensland
List of boarding schools

References

External links

Boys' schools in Queensland
Educational institutions established in 1902
Former Methodist schools in Australia
Presbyterian schools in Australia
Boarding schools in Queensland
Private secondary schools in Brisbane
Junior School Heads Association of Australia Member Schools
Uniting Church schools in Australia
Toowong
Atkinson & Conrad buildings
1902 establishments in Australia
Great Public Schools Association of Queensland